An American Presence Post (APP) is a very small diplomatic facility of the United States government located abroad.  It is usually staffed by a single Foreign Service Officer who carries the title of Consul. An American Presence Post is roughly equivalent to a Consulate, but lacks a regular consular section, and does not issue visas. These matters are referred to the closest full scale Consulate, or the Embassy which has jurisdiction over the APP. It is not uncommon to hear an APP casually referred to as a Consulate or Virtual Consulate.

List of American Presence Posts

American Presence Posts in Africa 
 Egypt
 Alexandria
 Morocco
 Western Sahara

American Presence Posts in Europe 
 France
 Bordeaux (opened 10/2000)
 Lille (opened 10/2000)
 Lyon (opened 12/1998)
 Rennes (opened 1/2000)
 Toulouse (opened 12/1999)

 United Kingdom
Cardiff, Wales (Virtual)

American Presence Posts in South America 
 Brazil
Belo Horizonte
 Porto Alegre

References

See also
Honorary consul

.
United States Department of State
Foreign relations of the United States